Myroslav Deda (born 28 May 1999 in Ukraine) is a professional Ukrainian football midfielder who plays for FC Volyn Lutsk in the Ukrainian Premier League.

Career
Deda is a product of the BRW-VIK and Volyn Youth Sportive School Systems. Then he signed a professional contract with  FC Volyn Lutsk in the Ukrainian Premier League.

He made his debut in the Ukrainian Premier League for FC Volyn on 26 November 2016, playing in the match against FC Dynamo Kyiv.

His twin brother Yaroslav is also a professional footballer.

References

External links
Profile at Official FFU Site (Ukr)

Living people
1999 births
Ukrainian footballers
Association football midfielders
Ukrainian Premier League players
FC Volyn Lutsk players
Twin sportspeople
Ukrainian twins
Sportspeople from Lviv Oblast